Zackenberg or Zackenburg is a mountain in Wollaston Foreland, NE Greenland.

Geography
This dark-hued mountain is located at the southern end of the western section of the Wollaston Foreland. Zackenberg rises steeply from the shore of the Zackenberg Bay on the northern side the Young Sound.
A river flows on its northern and eastern side forming a valley between this mountain and the higher Dombjerg to the north. 

The Zackenberg Station, a research facility, is built at the foot of the mountain.

See also
List of mountain peaks of Greenland

References

External links

Zackenberg climatic data 
Zackenberg